William Montgomery House may refer to:

in the United States
William Montgomery House (Elizabethtown, Kentucky), listed on the NRHP in Kentucky
William Montgomery House (Lancaster, Pennsylvania), listed on the NRHP in Pennsylvania

See also
Montgomery House (disambiguation)